Veritas, Prince of Truth is a 2007 computer-animated romance fantasy film directed by Arturo Ruiz-Esparza and starring Sean Patrick Flanery, Bret Loehr, Amy Jo Johnson, Tyler Posey, Kate Walsh, and Danny Strong.

Premise
A young boy must battle an evil menace that could destroy the Earth when Veritas, his favorite comic book hero, comes to life and seeks his help.

Characters

References

External links 

Veritas, Prince of Truth at Home Media Magazine
Veritas, Prince of Truth at dove.org

2007 films
2000s animated superhero films
2007 television films
American children's adventure films
2000s romantic fantasy films
American children's fantasy films
2000s teen fantasy films
2000s American animated films
American animated superhero films
American computer-animated films
Mexican animated films
Animated teen superhero films
2000s English-language films
2007 fantasy films
American romantic fantasy films
Mexican fantasy films
2000s Mexican films